Rabbit's Foot Meadery is a meadery and winery in Sunnyvale, California, United States.

History
Rabbit's Foot Meadery was founded in 1995 when Michael Faul of Sunnyvale, California began producing commercial versions of many historical recipes for brewing mead. Faul is credited with the expansion of the modern commercial mead making industry along with David Myers of Redstone Meadery in Boulder, Colorado.

Rabbit's Foot Meadery has won numerous awards and is known throughout the industry as a leader and innovator. Rabbit's Foot Meadery was the first company to produce commercially viable versions of cyser and braggot to create styles of mead from historical recipes.

The company is well known for producing articles on the production of mead and has been featured on national television and radio and notably on the internet radio talk show The Brewing Network where he provides a wealth of information to home mead makers and commercial producers alike.

Awards
 2003 International Mead Festival - Gold Medal Sweet Mead
 2003 International Mead Festival - Bronze Medal Dry Mead
 2005 International Mead Festival - Gold Medal Sweet Mead
 2005 International Mead Festival - Bronze Medal Apple Cyser
 2005 California State Fair - Silver Medal Sweet Mead
 2005 California State Fair - Bronze Medal Dry Mead
 2006 International Mead Festival - Gold Medal  Melia
 2006 International Mead Festival - Silver Medal Apple Cyser
 2006 International Mead Festival -Bronze Medal Lemon Cyser
 2007 International Mead Festival - Gold Medal Melia
 2007 International Mead Festival - Silver Medal Apple Cyser
 2007 International Mead Festival - Silver Medal Black Cherry Cyser
 2007 International Mead Festival - Bronze Medal Biere de Miele (Honey Ale)
 2007 California State Fair - Silver Medal Melia
 2007 Los Angeles International Wine Festival - Silver Medal Melia
 2008 International Mead Festival - Gold Medal Melia
 2008 International Mead Festival - Bronze Medal Biere de Miele
 2008 International Mead Festival - Gold Medal Melia
 2008 International Mead Festival - Bronze Medal Lemon Cyser
 2009 International Mead Festival - Mazer Cup - Gold Medal Diabhal - Belgian Style Golden Ale
 2009 International Mead Festival - Mazer Cup - Silver Medal Black Cherry Cyser
 2010 International Mead Festival - Mazer Cup - Gold Medal Diabhal - Belgian Style Golden Ale
 2011 International Mead Festival - Mazer Cup - Gold Medal Diabhal - Belgian Style Golden Ale
 2011 International Mead Festival - Mazer Cup - Silver Medal Black Cherry Cyser
 2013 International Mead Festival - Mazer Cup - Gold Medal Diabhal - Belgian Style Golden Ale
 2013 International Mead Festival - Mazer Cup - Silver Medal Biere de Miel
 2014 California Cider Competition - Silver - Red Branch Cider Company Hard Raspberry
 2014 California Cider Competition - Bronze - Red Branch Cider Company Hard Black Cherry
 2015 International Mead Festival - Mazer Cup - Gold Medal Honey Stout - Stout 
 2015 International Mead Festival - Mazer Cup - Silver Medal Biere de Miel - Kolsch
 2015 International Mead Festival - Mazer Cup - Bronze Medal Diabhal - Belgian Style Golden Ale
 2015 International Mead Festival - Mazer Cup - Bronze Medal - Melia
 2016 International Mead Festival - Mazer Cup - Gold Medal - Honey Stout 
 2016 International Mead Festival - Mazer Cup - Gold Medal - Naughty Ninja - Ginger Cyser - Session Mead
 2016 International Mead Festival - Mazer Cup - Silver Medal - Johnny Jump Up - Dry Hopped
 2016 International Mead Festival - Mazer Cup - Bronze Medal - Hard Raspberry Cyser
 2017 International Mead Festival - Mazer Cup - Gold Medal - Hel 
 2017 International Mead Festival - Mazer Cup - Bronze - Biere de Miel

See also
 California wine
 List of breweries in California
 Mead in the United States

References

External links
 

Companies based in Sunnyvale, California
Mead
Food and drink in the San Francisco Bay Area
Food and drink companies based in California
Wineries in California
American companies established in 1995
Food and drink companies established in 1995
1995 establishments in California